The Danish royal family is the dynastic family of the monarch. All members of the Danish royal family except Queen Margrethe II hold the title of Prince/Princess of Denmark Or  Count/Countess of Monpezat children of the monarch and of the heir apparent are accorded the style of His/Her Royal Highness, while other members of the dynasty are addressed as His/Her Highness. The Queen is styled Her Majesty.

The Queen, her siblings and her descendants belong to the House of Glücksburg, which is a branch of the Royal House of Oldenburg. The Queen's children and male-line descendants also belong agnatically to the Laborde de Monpezat family, and were given the concurrent title Count/Countess of Monpezat by royal decree on 30 April 2008.

The Danish royal family receives remarkably high approval ratings in Denmark, ranging between 82% and 92%. However, polls done in 2022 put the approval ratings at 69%.

Main members
The Danish royal family includes:
 The Queen (the monarch)
 The Crown Prince and Crown Princess (the Queen's son and daughter-in-law)
 Prince Christian (the Queen's grandson)
 Princess Isabella (the Queen's granddaughter)
 Prince Vincent (the Queen's grandson)
 Princess Josephine (the Queen's granddaughter)
 Prince Joachim and Princess Marie (the Queen's son and daughter-in-law)
 Count Nikolai (the Queen's eldest grandson)
 Count Felix (the Queen's grandson)
 Count Henrik (the Queen's grandson)
 Countess Athena (the Queen's granddaughter)
 The Dowager Princess of Sayn-Wittenstein-Berleburg (the Queen's sister)
Queen Anne-Marie of Greece (the Queen's sister)

Family tree of members

Note
* Extended members include the Greek Royal Family

Members of the extended royal family

Royal family of Greece

Most of the members of the deposed royal family of Greece hold the title of Prince or Princess of Greece and Denmark with the qualification of His or Her Highness, pursuant to the Royal Cabinet Order of 1774 and as agnatic descendants of George I of Greece, who, as the son of the future King Christian IX of Denmark, was (and remained) a "Prince of Denmark" prior to his accession to the throne of Greece in 1863. Until 1953 his dynastic male-line descendants remained in Denmark's order succession. However, no Danish act has revoked usage of the princely title for these descendants, neither for those living in 1953, nor for those born subsequently or who have since married into the dynasty.

There are three members of the Greek royal family who are not known to bear the title of Prince/ss of Denmark with the qualification of His/Her Highness.
 Marina, Princess Michael of Greece and Denmark
 Princess Alexandra of Greece
 The Duchess of Aosta

The following, consorts of royal monarchs today, were born with the titles of Prince/Princess of Greece and Denmark although they are not descended from King Constantine and Queen Anne-Marie:
 Queen Sofia of Spain (King Constantine's sister and Queen Anne-Marie's sister-in-law)

Royal family of Norway

The royal family of Norway descends in the legitimate male line from Frederick VIII of Denmark, Queen Margrethe II's great-grandfather. Haakon VII of Norway, who was born Prince Carl of Denmark as Frederick VIII's younger son, was, like his uncle, George I of Greece, invited to reign over another nation. As with the Greek branch's descendants, members of the Norwegian line no longer have succession rights to the Danish crown, but unlike the Greek dynasts they discontinued use of Danish royal titles upon ascending to the Norwegian throne in 1905.

Counts and countesses of Monpezat

On 30 April 2008, the Queen of Denmark granted to her two sons, Crown Prince Frederik and Prince Joachim, and their legitimate patrilineal descendants of both sexes the hereditary title "Count of Monpezat". The title is based on the French title "Comte de Laborde de Monpezat" which was used by their father Henrik, Prince Consort of Denmark.

On 29 September 2022, it was announced that from 1 January 2023 on, the titles of Prince and Princess of Denmark, and style of Highness of the 4 children of Queen Margrethe II's younger son, Prince Joachim, will be discontinued. They will be instead titled as "His/Her Excellency Count/Countess Nikolai/Felix/Henrik/Athena of Monpezat". All four grandchildren maintain their places in the order of succession to the throne.

Counts and countesses of Rosenborg
Danish princes who marry without consent of the Danish monarch lose their succession rights, as do their descendants. They are then usually accorded the hereditary title "Count of Rosenborg". They, their wives, and their legitimate male-line descendants are:
 Count Ingolf and Countess Sussie of Rosenborg (Prince Knud of Denmark's elder son and his wife)
 Countess Josephine of Rosenborg (daughter of Prince Knud of Denmark's younger son, Count Christian of Rosenborg)
 Countess Camilla of Rosenborg (daughter of Prince Knud of Denmark's younger son, Count Christian of Rosenborg)
 Countess Feodora of Rosenborg (daughter of Prince Knud of Denmark's younger son, Count Christian of Rosenborg)
 Count Ulrik and Countess Judi of Rosenborg (son of Prince Harald of Denmark's younger son, Count Oluf of Rosenborg, and his wife)
 Count Philip of Rosenborg (Count Ulrik's son)
 Countess Katharina of Rosenborg (Count Ulrik's daughter)
 Countess Charlotte of Rosenborg (daughter of Prince Harald of Denmark's younger son, Count Oluf of Rosenborg)
 Count Axel and Countess Jutta of Rosenborg (son of Prince Axel of Denmark's younger son, Count Flemming Valdemar of Rosenborg, and his wife)
 Count Carl Johan of Rosenborg (Count Axel's son)
 Count Alexander of Rosenborg (Count Axel's son)
 Countess Julie of Rosenborg (Count Axel's daughter)
 Countess Désirée of Rosenborg (Count Axel's daughter)
 Count Birger and Countess Lynne of Rosenborg (son of Prince Axel of Denmark's younger son, Count Flemming Valdemar of Rosenborg, and his wife)
 Countess Benedikte of Rosenborg (Count Birger's daughter) 
 Count Carl Johan of Rosenborg (son of Prince Axel of Denmark's younger son, Count Flemming Valdemar of Rosenborg)
 Countess Caroline of Rosenborg (Count Carl Johan's daughter)
 Countess Josefine of Rosenborg (Count Carl Johan's daughter)
 Countess Désirée of Rosenborg (daughter of Prince Axel of Denmark's younger son, Count Flemming Valdemar of Rosenborg)
 Countess Karin of Rosenborg (widow of Count Christian of Rosenborg, son of Prince Valdemar of Denmark's third son, Count Erik of Rosenborg)
 Count Valdemar of Rosenborg (Count Christian's son)
 Count Nicolai of Rosenborg (Count Valdemar's son)
 Countess Marie of Rosenborg (Count Valdemar's daughter)
 Countess Marina of Rosenborg (Count Christian's daughter)

 Counts and countesses of Samsøe 
The Danneskiold-Samsøe family have been descendants of the eldest son of Christian V and his mistress Sofie Amalie Moth, whom the king elevated to be the first Lensgrevinde til Samsø ("Countess of Samsø"). A descendant, Countess Frederikke Louise af Danneskiold-Samsøe (1699-1744) married her kinsman Christian August, Duke of Schleswig-Holstein-Sonderburg-Augustenburg. By royal statutory regulation, the Counts of Danneskiold-Samsøe and their male-line descendants are ranked as the second-highest nobles in Denmark, second only to the Counts of Rosenborg, whom also descent from the Danish Kings. With a place in the 1st Class No. 13, they are entitled to the style "His/Her Excellency".

Line of succession

The first law governing the succession to the Danish throne as a hereditary monarchy was the Kongeloven (Lex Regia), enacted 14 November 1665, and published in 1709. It declared that the crown of Denmark shall descend by heredity to the legitimate descendants of King Frederick III, and that the order of succession shall follow semi-Salic primogeniture, according to which the crown is inherited by an heir, with preference among the Monarch's children to males over females; among siblings to the elder over the younger; and among Frederick III's remoter descendants by substitution, senior branches over junior branches. Female descendants were eligible to inherit the throne in the event there were no eligible surviving male dynasts born in the male line. As for the duchies, Holstein and Lauenburg where the King ruled as duke, these lands adhered to Salic law (meaning that only males could inherit the ducal throne), and by mutual agreement were permanently conjoined. The duchies of Schleswig (a Danish fief), Holstein and Lauenburg (German fiefs) were joined in personal union with the Crown of Denmark.

This difference caused problems when Frederick VII of Denmark proved childless, making a change in dynasty imminent, and causing the lines of succession for the duchies on one hand and for Denmark on the other to diverge. That meant that the new King of Denmark would not also be the new Duke of Schleswig or Duke of Holstein. To ensure the continued adhesion of the Elbe duchies to the Danish Crown, the line of succession to the duchies was modified in the London Protocol of 1852, which designated Prince Christian of Schleswig-Holstein-Sonderburg-Glücksburg, as the new heir apparent, although he was, strictly, the heir neither to the Crown of Denmark nor to the Duchies of Schleswig, Holstein or Lauenburg by primogeniture. Originally, the Danish prime minister Christian Albrecht Bluhme wanted to keep the separate hereditary principles, but in the end the government decided on a uniform agnatic primogeniture, which was accepted by the Parliament.

This order of succession remained in effect for a hundred years, then the Salic law was changed to male-preference primogeniture in 1953, meaning that females with no brothers could inherit. In 2009, the mode of inheritance of the throne was once more changed, this time into an absolute primogeniture. This imposed no immediate change on the line of succession as it was then, as Prince Vincent had not yet been born.  the line of succession was:
 Crown Prince Frederik
 Prince Christian
 Princess Isabella
 Prince Vincent
 Princess Josephine
 Prince Joachim
 Count Nikolai
 Count Felix
 Count Henrik
 Countess Athena
 Princess Benedikte

Privileges and restrictions
Following the transformation of Denmark's monarchy from elective (at least theoretically, although it had generally descended to the eldest son of the House of Oldenburg since 1448) to hereditary in 1660, the so-called Kongelov (Lex Regia'' in Latin) of 1665 established the reign "by the grace of God" of King Frederick III and his posterity. Of the articles of this law, all except Article 21 and Article 25 have been repealed by amendments to the Constitution in 1849, 1853, 1953, and 2009.

Article 21 states "No Prince of the Blood, who resides here in the Realm and in Our territory, shall marry, or leave the Country, or take service under foreign Masters, unless he receives Permission from the King". Under this provision, princes of Denmark who permanently reside in other realms by express permission of the Danish Crown (i.e. members of the dynasties of Greece, Norway and the United Kingdom) do not thereby forfeit their royalty in Denmark, nor are they bound to obtain prior permission to travel abroad or to marry from its sovereign, although since 1950 those not descended in male-line from King Christian IX are no longer in the line of succession to the Danish throne. However, those who do reside in Denmark or its territories require the monarch's prior permission to travel abroad and to marry.

Article 25 stipulates, with respect to blood members of the Royal dynasty: "They should answer to no Magistrate Judges, but their first and last Judge shall be the King, or to whomsoever He decrees.". The wording excludes those whose blood cannot be traced to a Danish monarch (e.g., the present Crown Princess).

Notes
1Princess Benedikte's children have no succession rights. This is because the marriage consent given to her had very specific provisions; if Benedikte ever became the heir presumptive, she and her husband would have to take permanent residence in Denmark and her children would only have succession rights if they had applied for naturalization upon reaching adulthood, and taken up residence in Denmark: (a) at the time of becoming the immediate heir to the throne, and (b) no later than when they reached the age of mandatory schooling under Danish law. Since the children continued to be educated in Germany well past the mandatory schooling age, they are deemed to no longer have succession rights.

2Queen Anne-Marie has no succession rights, and her descendants have none through her, because the permission granted for her marriage stipulated that she renounced her claim to the Danish throne upon becoming Queen consort of the Hellenes.

See also
 Danish nobility
 Line of succession to the Norwegian throne

References

External links

 Kongehuset.dk Official site of the Danish Monarchy.
 Counts and Countesses of Rosenborg

Royal family
Danish culture
Danish royal houses